Ignacio Reinosa (born 9 May 1944) is a Puerto Rican athlete. He competed in the men's discus throw at the 1964 Summer Olympics, and the 1974 Central American and Caribbean Games.

References

1944 births
Living people
Athletes (track and field) at the 1964 Summer Olympics
People from Santurce, Puerto Rico
Puerto Rican male discus throwers
Olympic track and field athletes of Puerto Rico
Central American and Caribbean Games medalists in athletics